Alan Haven (1 April 1935 – 7 January 2016), born in Prestwich, Lancashire, United Kingdom, was an English jazz organist. His original name was Alan Halpern and he was Jewish. He lived off Kings Road and attended Kings Road School, Prestwich.

He was known for his collaborations with John Barry in the James Bond films From Russia with Love (1963) and Goldfinger (1964), the comedy film A Jolly Bad Fellow (1964), and in the Richard Lester film The Knack …and How to Get It (1965). He released a single from the Lester film, but is perhaps best known for the single Image in 1965 (originally recorded by The Hank Levine Orchestra), which was frequently used as a theme tune on the offshore radio station Radio Caroline and also featured in the 1965 horror film The Night Caller. His early work was performed on a Lowrey organ.

When Barry decided to adapt his own Oscar-winning theme from the 1968 medieval drama The Lion in Winter as a single, he wrote an extended solo for organ with Haven in mind. As released, the jazz adaptation marks a notable departure from the soundtrack score which featured a choir singing in Latin.

Haven also released several albums in the 1960s and 1970s, initially on Fontana Records, then CBS Records including a recording of a live set at Ronnie Scott's in London. A 1966 album, Live at Annie's Room (recorded at Annie Ross's eponymous club) featured one of several collaborations with drummer Tony Crombie. Haven's friend Spike Milligan contributed the album notes for the 1971 release St. Elmo's Fire.

Haven was married to 1965 Miss World winner Lesley Langley in the 1960s and they had one daughter.

Mal Jefferson, record producer, writes:

References

External links

1935 births
People from Prestwich
English organists
English jazz organists
British male organists
2016 deaths
British male jazz musicians